The Rt Rev William Johnston (7 July 1914 – 23 May 1986) was Bishop of Dunwich from 1977 to 1980.

He was born on 7 July 1914  and educated at Bromsgrove School  and Selwyn College, Cambridge. After ordination he held curacies in Headingley and  Knaresborough. Following this he was Vicar of St. Bartholomew's Church, Armley, then of St Chad, Shrewsbury and finally (before elevation to the episcopate) Archdeacon of Bradford. He died on 23 May 1986.

Notes

1914 births
People educated at Bromsgrove School
Alumni of Selwyn College, Cambridge
Archdeacons of Bradford
Bishops of Dunwich
20th-century Church of England bishops
1986 deaths